The Wehrmacht exhibition was a series of two exhibitions focusing on the war crimes of the Wehrmacht (the regular German armed forces) during World War II. The exhibitions were instrumental in furthering the understanding of the myth of the clean Wehrmacht in Germany. Both exhibitions were produced by the Hamburg Institute for Social Research; the first under the title "War of Annihilation. Crimes of the Wehrmacht 1941 to 1944", which opened in Hamburg on 5 March 1995 and travelled to 33 German and Austrian cities. It was the subject of a terrorist attack but the organizers nonetheless claimed it had been attended by 800,000 visitors. The second exhibitionwhich was first shown in Berlin in November 2001attempted to dissipate considerable controversy generated by the first exhibition according to the Institute.

History
The popular and controversial travelling exhibition was seen by an estimated 1.2 million visitors over the last decade. Using written documents from the era and archival photographs, the organizers had shown that the Wehrmacht was "involved in planning and implementing a war of annihilation against Jews, prisoners of war, and the civilian population". Historian Hannes Heer and Gerd Hankel had prepared it.

The view of the "unblemished" Wehrmacht was shaken by the material evidence put on public display in different cities including Hamburg, Munich, Berlin, Bielefeld, Vienna, and Leipzig. On 9 March 1999 at 4:40am, a bomb attack on the exhibition occurred in Saarbrücken, damaging the adult high school building housing the exhibition and the adjoining Schlosskirche church.

Wrongly attributed images, criticism and review

After criticism about incorrect attribution such as pictures of Soviet atrocities wrongly attributed to Germans and captioning of some of the images in the exhibition, the exhibition was heavily criticized by some historians such as e.g. by Polish-born historian Bogdan Musiał and Hungarian historian Krisztián Ungváry. According to Ungváry, only ten percent of all the 800 photos of alleged war crimes were actually Wehrmacht crimes, the rest were Soviet war crimes or crimes committed by Hungarian, Finnish, Croatian, Ukrainian or Baltic forces, or by members of the SS or SD, none of whom were members of the Wehrmacht, or not crimes at all.

The head and founder of the Hamburg Institute for Social Research, Jan Philipp Reemtsma suspended the display, pending review of its content by a committee of historians. After the review  20 out of 1400 pictures were found to be of Soviet atrocities.

The committee's report in 2000 stated that accusations of forged materials were not justified, but that some of the exhibit's documentation had inaccuracies and that the arguments presented were too sweeping. In a written statement, Reemtsma said:

In its report from November 2000, the committee reaffirmed the reliability of the exhibition in general, explaining that the errors had already been corrected. The committee recommended that the exhibition be expanded to include perspectives of the victims as well, presenting the material but leaving the conclusions to the viewers.

Notably, the exhibition does not inform about the Wehrmachts crimes in occupied Poland on either side of the Curzon Line. They were presented later as an entirely different exposition called Größte Härte: Verbrechen der Wehrmacht in Polen September/Oktober 1939 (Crimes of the Wehrmacht in Poland, September/October 1939) by the Deutsches Historisches Institut Warschau.

Revised exhibition, 2001–2004
The revised exhibition was renamed Verbrechen der Wehrmacht. Dimensionen des Vernichtungskrieges 1941–1944. ("Crimes of the German Wehrmacht: Dimensions of a War of Annihilation 1941-1944"). It focused on public international law and travelled from 2001 to 2004.  Since then, it has been moved permanently to the Deutsches Historisches Museum in Berlin.

Films
The documentary Der unbekannte Soldat (The unknown soldier) by Michael Verhoeven was in cinemas from August 2006, and has been available on DVD since February 2007. It compares the two versions of the exhibitions, and the background of its maker Jan Philipp Reemtsma.

See also
 Myth of the clean Wehrmacht
 War crimes of the Wehrmacht
 Nazi crimes against the Polish nation
 German mistreatment of Soviet prisoners of war

References

Further reading
 Hartmann, Christian; Hürter, Johannes; Jureit, Ulrike (2005): Verbrechen der Wehrmacht. Bilanz einer Debatte [Crimes of the Wehrmacht: Review of the Debate], Munich: C.H. Beck,

External links
Institut für Sozialforschung: Verbrechen der Wehrmacht. Dimensionen des Vernichtungskrieges 1941-1944
Bericht der Kommission zur Überprüfung der Ausstellung "Vernichtungskrieg. Verbrechen der Wehrmacht 1941 bis 1944" (PDF, 362 KB)
Deutsche Nationalbibliothek: Titel zum Thema
Volker Ullrich (Die ZEIT, 22 January 2004): Conversation with Ulrike Jureit, Jan Philipp Reemtsma and Norbert Frei to close the exhibition
'Zwei Ausstellungen - eine Bilanz' von Jan Philipp Reemtsma
Klick-nach-rechts: Materialiensammlung rund um die Wehrmachtsausstellung
"The Wehrmacht exhibition that shocked Germany" at Witness History (BBC World Service)

War crimes of the Wehrmacht
Wehrmacht
Military history of Germany during World War II
Traveling exhibits
1995 establishments in Germany
History of museums
Museology